The Main Street Historic Commercial District in Point Arena, California is a  historic district that was listed on the National Register of Historic Places in 1990.  It included 21 contributing buildings.

References

Commercial buildings on the National Register of Historic Places in California
Geography of Mendocino County, California
Historic districts on the National Register of Historic Places in California
National Register of Historic Places in Mendocino County, California